Wild to Go is a 1926 American silent Western film directed by Robert De Lacey and starring Tom Tyler, Frankie Darro and Eugenia Gilbert.

Cast
 Tom Tyler as Tom Blake 
 Frankie Darro as Frankie Blake 
 Fred Burns as Simon Purdy 
 Ethan Laidlaw as Jake Trumbull 
 Earl Haley as Henchman 'Baldy' 
 Eugenia Gilbert as Marjorie Felton

References

Bibliography
 Munden, Kenneth White. The American Film Institute Catalog of Motion Pictures Produced in the United States, Part 1. University of California Press, 1997.

External links
 

1926 films
1926 Western (genre) films
American black-and-white films
1920s English-language films
Films directed by Robert De Lacey
Film Booking Offices of America films
Silent American Western (genre) films
1920s American films